The Theban Tomb TT9 is located in Deir el-Medina, part of the Theban Necropolis, on the west bank of the Nile, opposite to Luxor. It is the burial place of an ancient Egyptian artisan (his exact title was Servant in the Place of Truth) named Amenmose, who lived during the 20th Dynasty, during the reign of Ramesses III.

Amenmose was a Servant in the Place of Truth and a Charmer of Scorpions. His wife was named Tent-hom.

See also
 List of Theban tombs

References

Buildings and structures completed in the 13th century BC
Theban tombs